Fiacre may refer to:

Fiacre (carriage), a horse-drawn carriage
One of three Irish saints known as Saint Fiacre
The French commune of Saint-Fiacre, Seine-et-Marne